Francis William Musson  (31 May 1894 – 2 January 1962) was an English cricketer active from 1914 to 1927 who played for Lancashire. He was born in Clitheroe and died in Chatham. He appeared in 19 first-class matches as a righthanded batsman and wicketkeeper. He scored 539 runs with a highest score of 75 and held 13 catches with four stumpings.

Notes

1894 births
1962 deaths
English cricketers
Lancashire cricketers
North v South cricketers
Royal Air Force cricketers
Civil Service cricketers
English civil servants